The 1983 Air Force Falcons football team represented the United States Air Force Academy in the Western Athletic Conference (WAC) during the 1983 NCAA Division I-A football season. Led by fifth-year head coach Ken Hatfield, Air Force played its home games at Falcon Stadium in Colorado Springs  and finished the regular season at 9–2 (5–2 in WAC, runner-up). The Falcons were invited to play in the Independence Bowl and defeated Ole Miss 9–3. With a 10–2 record, Air Force climbed to thirteenth in the final AP poll.

After the season in December, Hatfield left for Arkansas, his alma mater, where he succeeded Lou Holtz as head coach. Days later, offensive coordinator Fisher DeBerry was promoted, and was the Falcons' head coach for the next 23 seasons.

Schedule

Personnel

Game summaries

Notre Dame
Chris Funk blocked a field goal in the final seconds to preserve the win for Air Force.

Awards and honors
 John Kreshner, 3rd Team All-American (Football News)

References

Air Force
Air Force Falcons football seasons
Independence Bowl champion seasons
Air Force Falcons football